Chapman Mortimer was the pen name of William Charles ("W. C.") Chapman Mortimer (15 May 1907 – 1988), a Scottish novelist.  He won the James Tait Black Award for fiction in 1951 for his novel Father Goose.

Works
 A Stranger on the Stair (novel) (1950)
 Father Goose (novel) (1951)
 Young Men Waiting (novel) (1952)
 Mediterraneo (novel) (1955)
 Here in Spain (travel) (1955)
 Madrigal (novel) (1960)
 Amparo (novel) (1971)

References

Scottish novelists
1907 births
1988 deaths
James Tait Black Memorial Prize recipients
20th-century British novelists